Alvarez Silal Isnaji (born February 19, 1946) is a Filipino politician who served as acting governor of the Autonomous Region in  Muslim Mindanao (ARMM) after Nur Misuari was removed in 2001. He briefly served as the Governor of ARMM in September 3, 2001 until October 11, 2001 when Nur Misuari went on an official leave.  He was succeed by Parouk Hussin on December 27, 2001.

He is a member of the Moro National Liberation Front (MNLF). On April 4, 2002, Isnaji claimed to have been elected as chairman of the MNLF, which was disputed by founding chairman Nur Misuari. This effectively caused the creation of a faction of within the MNLF identified as the MNLF-Central Committee (MNLF-CC).

In 2007, Alvarez Isnaji was elected as the mayor of Indanan and the President of Mayor’s League -1st District.

In earlier 2008, during his term as mayor, he filed a candidacy running for governor in (2008 Armm General Election, Aug14 2008) challenging the incumbent,  Zaldy Ampatuan. Alvarez Isnaji, known as  “The Common Candidate“  is most likely going to win the election since he had been elected as governor back in 2001. 

In June 2008, ABS-CBN news journalist Ces Drilon and her cameraman were kidnapped by the Abu Sayyaf militants group in Indanan, Sulu. Isnaji, then mayor was involved in the negotiations for the release of the abducted. Kidnapping for ransom charges would be filed against Isnaji and his son. Isnaji claimed that his involvement was done under the directive of Interior Secretary Ronaldo Puno. The Abu Sayyaf militants alleged that they choose the Isnajis to negotiating in their behalf. The Isnajis were suspected to have planned the kidnapping themselves and to have took portions of a supposed ransom paid for the Drilon and the cameraman's release. The two were released and deemed innocent by a Manila-based court in 2010. The Court of Appeals of the Philippines ordered for the revival of the case in 2011.

Isnaji ran for governor in the 2008 ARMM election as an independent candidate and launched a campaign while detained due to the Drilon kidnapping case.

Political career 

 Speaker of the House ARMM
 Assemblyman RLA-ARMM
 Regional Vice Governor of ARMM
 Acting Regional Governor of ARMM
 Cabinet Secretary DOST-ARMM
 Municipality Mayor of Indanan (President of the Mayor’s League in the 1st District)

References 

Living people
1946 births
Mayors of places in Sulu
Governors of the Autonomous Region in Muslim Mindanao
Filipino Muslims